Roberto Carlos Acosta Coronel (born 12 July 1984) is a Paraguay international footballer who plays for Sol de América, as a goalkeeper.

Career
Acosta has played club football for Libertad, Tacuary and Sol de América.

International career
He was called to be international with Paraguay in 2013.

References

External links
 
 
 
 
 

1984 births
Living people
Paraguayan footballers
Paraguay international footballers
Association football goalkeepers